Bruce Carruthers may refer to:

 Wallace Bruce Matthews Carruthers (1863–1910), Canadian soldier and founder of the Canadian Signalling Corps
 Bruce Carruthers (footballer) (1903–1988), Australian rules footballer
 Bruce Maitland Carruthers (1892–1951), Australian physician and surgeon